Toffel is a surname. Notable people with the surname include:

 Michael Toffel, American economist
 Roger Toffel (1909–1969), Swiss Olympic field hockey player

See also
 Toffey
 Toffler
 Toffolo